Bocchus is the name of 2 kings of Mauretania.

 Bocchus I
 Bocchus II